Nikhil Persaud is a professional poker player from London, and he has been playing poker for several years. He started off life as an STT grinder on Ladbrokes Poker, and he now plays online under the alias ‘reraiseallin.’

Persaud is participated in partaken iseveraln a number of televised events, including the 2009 series: Late Night Poker. His best performance on the small screen came in 2006 when he won both his heat and semi-final of the European Open III in Maidstone before finishing fifth in the final for $25,000. On the road to the final, he defeated likes of Ian Frazer and Thomas Bihl, but the event was ultimately won by Irish veteran Liam Flood.

He writes a monthly strategy column for Bluff Magazine, and he is often featured as a speaker at various Boot Camps across the country, including the 2009 and 2010 Poker in the Park in London and Leicester Square. Persaud also commentates alongside Jesse May on Matchroom Sport televised poker shows.

On April 27, 2009, Persaud co-launched both Black Belt Poker with fellow poker pro and the 2008 Irish Open champion Neil Channing. He is also sponsored by the site as one of their Brown Belts.

In 2009, Persaud cashed in the World Series of Poker Main Event, finishing 549th for $23,196. He also made the money in 2005.

On November 22, 2010, Persaud was the winner of the 2010 World Heads-Up Poker Championship at the London Grosvenor Victoria Casino, defeating amongst others; Team Pokerstars Pro, 2006 London EPT winner Victoria Coren, 2010 EPT Vilamoura winner Toby Lewis, and eventual runner-up Leon Louis.

References

External links
Hendon Mob Results

Poker players from London
Living people
Year of birth missing (living people)
British sportspeople of Indian descent